Niliya Besedina-Kulakova (born 1 December 1935) is a Soviet hurdler. She competed in the women's 80 metres hurdles at the 1956 Summer Olympics.

References

1935 births
Living people
Athletes (track and field) at the 1956 Summer Olympics
Soviet female hurdlers
Olympic athletes of the Soviet Union
Place of birth missing (living people)